Euplexidia is a genus of moths of the family Noctuidae.

Species
 Euplexidia albiguttata (Warren, 1912)
 Euplexidia angusta Yoshimoto, 1987
 Euplexidia benescripta (Prout) 
 Euplexidia exotica Yoshimoto, 1987
 Euplexidia noctuiformis (Hampson, 1896)
 Euplexidia pallidivirens Yoshimoto, 1987
 Euplexidia violascens (Boursin, 1964)

References
Natural History Museum Lepidoptera genus database
Euplexidia at funet 

Hadeninae